Khumanlol, also spelt as Khumanlon, is a chronicle (puya) of the genealogy of the rulers of the Khuman dynasty, which flourished as an independent principality in the south of Ancient Manipur, and later absorbed into the Meitei ethnicity in the fourteenth century AD.

It is categorized as one of the historical documents of the ethnic groups settling in Manipur since seventh century AD.

Related pages 

 Ningthourol Lambuba

Sources 

 https://books.google.co.in/books?id=ajUysziXJzIC&q=khumanlon&dq=khumanlon&hl=en&sa=X&ved=2ahUKEwjlwofp4eHuAhVX7nMBHfw1C20Q6AEwAHoECAEQAg

References 

History of India
Puyas
Pages with unreviewed translations